Victoria City was a federal electoral district in British Columbia, Canada, that was represented in the House of Commons of Canada from 1904 to 1924. This riding was created in 1903 from Victoria riding. It was identical at the time of its creation to the provincial electoral district of the same name. It was abolished in 1924 into a new Victoria riding.

The district elected its MP through First past the post voting system.

Geography
It covered the City of Victoria.

Members of Parliament

Election results

See also 
 List of Canadian federal electoral districts
 Past Canadian electoral districts

External links 
 Website of the Parliament of Canada
Elections Canada historical returns

Defunct British Columbia federal electoral districts on Vancouver Island
Politics of Victoria, British Columbia